Djamila Taís Ribeiro dos Santos (born 1980) is a Brazilian Black feminist philosopher and journalist. She graduated in political philosophy from the Federal University of São Paulo, where she also earned a master's degree on the work of Simone de Beauvoir and Judith Butler. Ribeiro is a collaborating editor of weekly magazine CartaCapital, as well as a columnist for CartaCapital and Folha de S.Paulo.

In May 2016, she was appointed São Paulo's vice-secretary for Human Rights and Citizenship Affairs, thereby joining the Fernando Haddad administration.

She prefaced the Brazilian Portuguese edition of Women, Race and Class by Black feminist philosopher Angela Davis. Ribeiro and Davis have collaborated on a number of occasions.

Ribeiro also works as a blogger and online activist. In 2018, she appeared as a representative of Brazil's civil society at Harvard and MIT's joint annual Brazil Conference.

In her A Short Anti-racist Handbook (Port. Pequeno manual antirracista), inspired on the book How to Be an Antiracist by Ibram X. Kendi, Ribeiro calls upon white people to take responsibility and change attitudes which result in privileges and oppression. Being a follower of Candomblé, Ribeiro has written about how traditional women healers in Afro-descendant communities came to be portrayed as witches by Western civilisation.

In July 2020, Ribeiro decided to report Twitter to Brazil's Public Prosecutor's Office on the grounds that Twitter "economically exploits racism and misogyny" and "profits from attacks on defenceless Black women".

Education
In 2012, Djamila Ribeiro graduated in Philosophy at the School of Philosophy, Letters and Human Sciences of the Federal University of São Paulo (Unifesp), and became a Master in Political Philosophy at the same institution in 2015, with an emphasis on feminist theory. Currently, Djamila is part of the faculty of the Journalism course at PUC-SP.

Before studying Philosophy, Ribeiro began a degree in journalism. However, Djamila interrupted her studies in the area in 2005.

The philosopher is an active researcher in the academy, with racial and gender relations as her main field of research, as well as feminism. Djamila is a columnist for Folha de S. Paulo, and has also written for the online portals of CartaCapital, Blogueiras Negras and Revista AzMina, in addition to coordinating the Feminismos Plurais collection, by Pólen.

Ribeiro is the author of the works “Lugar de Fala”, “What is Lugar de Fala?”, “Who is afraid of black feminism?” and "Pequeno Manual Antirracista", which together sold more than 500,000 copies in the country. In addition to the books published, Djamila created the Selo Sueni Carneiro, which published books by black authors at more affordable prices.

Political Activism
In May 2016, Ribeiro was appointed Assistant Secretary for Human Rights and Citizenship of the city of São Paulo during the administration of Mayor Fernando Haddad.

In addition, she was invited in 2020 to be deputy on the ticket of Jilmar Tatto (PT) to the city hall of São Paulo. However, Djamila declined the invitation.

In 2022, at the opening of the season of the program Provoca, on TV Cultura, the writer verbalized that she would not sit down to talk to people linked to Bolsonarism, in view of the representation of this administration. In her own words:

“I would not sit with bolsonaristas people because of the representation of this administration. The constant attacks on black people, indigenous people and women. In addition to all the setbacks they defended. They even advocated policies of death. It completely flees from republican ideals”

Awards and honors
Throughout her career, Djamila has received awards such as the SP Citizen Award in Human Rights in 2016, Trip Transformadores in 2017, Best Columnist in the Women's Press Trophy in 2018 and Dandara dos Palmares Award.

The author was also nominated in 2019 for the Jabuti Prize, in the Humanities category, for the publication of the book "O que é Lugar de Fala?", when she became a finalist. In 2020, Djamila won the Jabuti Prize, this time for her work "Pequeno Manual Antirracista".

Also in 2019, Djamila received the Prince Claus Award in the Philosophy category, offered by the Dutch Ministry of Foreign Affairs, which recognized her activist struggle. In the same year, she was chosen as “Personality of Tomorrow” by the French government, and also was recognized as one of the BBC's 100 women.

In 2021, Djamila Ribeiro became the first Brazilian person to be awarded the BET Awards, the highest award of the American black community, being consecrated in the Global Good category.

In addition to all the awards, the philosopher is also among the 100 most influential people in the world under 40, according to the UN. She is also a counselor at the Vladimir Herzog Institute.

In 2022, Djamila was awarded the chair previously held by Lygia Fagundes Telles at the Academia Paulista de Letras.

Media Influence 
Djamila Ribeiro has already taught feminism classes for a group of TV Globo actresses and directors at Camila Pitanga's house, in Rio de Janeiro, in addition to providing specialized consultancy for the station's programs, such as the transgressor Amor & Sexo, by Fernanda Lima and the program Saia Justa, from the GNT. On instagram, Djamila currently has 1.2 million followers.

Publications 
O que é lugar de fala? (2017) (What Is Locus of Speech?)
Quem tem medo do feminismo negro? (2018) (Who's Afraid of Black Feminism?)
Pequeno manual antirracista (2019) (A Short Anti-racist Handbook)

References 

1980 births
Living people
Afro-Brazilian feminists
Anti-racism activists
Critical race theory
Brazilian philosophers
Brazilian columnists
Brazilian human rights activists
People from Santos, São Paulo
21st-century Brazilian women writers
21st-century Brazilian writers
BBC 100 Women
Brazilian Candomblés
Federal University of São Paulo alumni
Brazilian women philosophers